John Fairfield (1797–1847) was a U.S. Senator from Maine. Senator Fairfield may refer to:

April Fairfield, North Dakota State Senate
Edmund Burke Fairfield (1821–1904), Michigan State Senate